Sevastopol (Russian - Севастополь) is a city on the Black Sea, located in the southwest of the Crimean Peninsula—a territory disputed between Russia and Ukraine as a result of the 2014 Crimean crisis. It has been under the de facto Russian control since March 2014, when it was incorporated into Russia as one of its federal subjects, with a status of a federal city. Being a disputed territory, Sevastopol has two sets of laws governing how its administrative and municipal divisions are set up. Under both Ukrainian and Russian laws, the city is administratively divided into four districts.

Under the Ukrainian laws, the districts have both administrative and municipal status, while under the Russian laws the districts are purely administrative and have no further divisions. Within the Russian municipal framework, however, the territory of the federal city of Sevastopol is divided into nine municipal okrugs and the Town of Inkerman. While individual municipal divisions are contained within the borders of the administrative districts, they are not otherwise related to the administrative districts. The borders of the municipal okrugs are unchanged from the borders of the municipalities which exist under the Ukrainian law.

Divisions under the Ukrainian law
Sevastopol is divided into four raions (districts):

All settlements in Sevastopol are organized within the municipal raions. Most of the city's urban areas are located within the Lenin and Gagarin raions, with the Lenin Raion housing the city administration. The former Balaklava settlement, at the southern portion of Sevastopol, is part of the Balaklava Raion; a raion that contains 29 rural settlements which in turn comprise several villages. The town of Inkerman and the urban-type settlement of Kacha are located within the Balaklava Raion as well. The Chersonesus Taurica Preserve of Cultural Heritage with archaeological site and museum is located in the Gagarin Raion.

In part two of them (Gagarin and Lenin) includes only the streets, and the other two (Balaklava and Nakhimovskiy district) are also subject to 28 villages surrounding the city and more than 30 settlements without the status of settlement (such as agricultural or special settlements).

 Gagarin Raion 
Western part of the city. Includes: Chersonesus, Bays: Kozachiya, Kamishevaya, Omega, Streletskaya, Karantinnaya, beams: Yukharina and Mayachnaya and others.

 Lenin Raion 
Central part of the city. Includes: Karantinnaya Bay on the west, Sarandinakina and South Bays on the east coast of Sevastopol Bay—in the north and the border areas of Balaklava, and Gagarin—in the south.

 Nakhimov Raion 
Northern part of town, north side, and the territory north of the Belbek River. The region includes the North and the Ship side of Sevastopol, as well as rural area, with the following towns:

 Balaklava Raion 
South-eastern part of the city. Balaklava area (Ukrainian ) – Administrative Region in the south and east of the territory of the Sevastopol city council. On the territory of the Balaklava district is the southernmost point of the Ukraine – Cape Sarych.

On the territory of the Balaklava district are 34 settlements (in brackets are the historical, to the renaming of the 1940s, the names of villages):

Divisions under the Russian law
Under the Russian law, the only administrative divisions of the federal city of Sevastopol are the districts, which are the same four districts used under the Ukrainian laws. Within the Russian municipal framework, however, the territory of the federal city of Sevastopol is divided into nine municipal okrugs and the Town of Inkerman. While individual municipal divisions are contained within the borders of the administrative districts as to not create difficulties between various levels of governance, they are not otherwise related to those administrative districts.

List of municipal formations
Source:

Municipal formations within Balaklavsky District
Balaklavsky Municipal Okrug
Orlinovsky Municipal Okrug
Ternovsky Municipal Okrug
Town of Inkerman

Municipal formations within Gagarinsky District
Gagarinsky Municipal Okrug

Municipal formations within Leninsky District
Leninsky Municipal Okrug

Municipal formations within Nakhimovsky District
Andreyevsky Municipal Okrug
Kachinsky Municipal Okrug
Nakhimovsky Municipal Okrug
Verkhnesadovsky Municipal Okrug

References

Notes

Sources

Sevastopol
 
Sevastopol